The Cosulich Line, formally the Cosulich Societa Triestina di Navigazione, is a steamship line that was based in Trieste, Italy. The company had been founded in 1889 by Antonio F. Cosulich's son as a family business. In 1903 as Unione Austriaca di Navigazione, more commonly called the Austro-American or Austro-Americana Line, when Trieste was under the rule of Austria-Hungary. After the first World War, the company became an Italian-based shipping company.  In 1932 the company was forced to merge with the Lloyd Sabaudo and the Navigazione Generale Italiana, to form the Italian Line.

History 

In 1857 Captain Antonio F. Cosulich launched the family business with the 500-tonne ship Fides built-in Cherso, a Kavner Island of Istria. The company's first four ships were purchased from England in the year it was founded. The first voyages took place every six weeks and went from Trieste to Mobile, Brunswick, Charleston, Wilmington, and Newport News, as well as to other ports on the East Coast as required. Since business was good, three more used ships were bought in 1897 and four in 1898. In 1901 was a turning point for the shipping business As a result of the global economic crisis of 1901–1902, some of the ships had to be sold again. In 1902, William Burell left the company and sold his shares to the Cosulich brothers. The share capital was increased, 14 ships were taken over from the Cosulich shipping company and in 1903 the company was renamed Unione Austriaca di Navigazione già Austro-Americana e Fratelli Cosulich Società Anonima or the Austro-American line.

Unione Austriaca di Navigazione was founded in Trieste in 1903 by Fratelli Cosulich. The Cosulich family originated from the island of Lussino (today Lošinj, Croatia) now operating as the Austro-American Line, ships of the company carried passengers from Trieste to Messina, Naples, Palermo, and New York. Service to South American ports and New Orleans began in 1907 (though the New Orleans service was quickly discontinued).
In 1904 the company had 19 ships. In the same year, passengers were also transported for the first time, since many people emigrated to the United States at that time, and a profitable business area was therefore offered. Here you could also divert customers from the two North German competitors Norddeutscher Lloyd and Hamburg America Line. With the entry into the passenger business, however, one also reacted to the agreement with the English Cunard line with the Hungarian government, which planned to take over the Hungarian emigrant traffic. Cosulich made arrangements with the Canadian Pacific Steamship Company for service from Trieste to Canada which proved to be uneconomical and was canceled after six voyages. At the outbreak of World War I, passenger services ceased.

After the Armistice, Trieste came under the rule of Italy. Reorganized as an Italian company under the name Cosulich Societa Triestina di Navigazione, or Cosulich STN, the line, now sailing under the Cosulich Line name, resumed service from Mediterranean ports to New York and South America. In 1932, the Cosulich Line and fellow Italian passenger companies Lloyd Sabaudo and Navigazione Generale Italiana were merged into the state-owned Italia Flotte Riunite, or ITALIA, though Cosulich was able to maintain its management from Trieste. When ITALIA was liquidated in 1937, Cosulich was absorbed into the replacement Italia Societa Anonima di Navigazione, or Italian Line.

The company exists today as the Fratelli Cosulich Group, still a shipowner and based in Trieste.

See also 
 Lošinj

References

Citations

Bibliography

External links
 Fratelli Cosulich Group
 Italian Steamship Lines History and Ephemera Including Cosulich Line - Trieste GG Archives

Transport companies established in 1903
Defunct shipping companies
Companies of Austria-Hungary 
Companies based in Trieste
Defunct transport companies of Italy
Transatlantic shipping companies
1903 establishments in Austria-Hungary
Transport companies disestablished in 1937
1937 disestablishments in Italy